The Lisbon Bridge over the Sheyenne River in Lisbon, North Dakota, also known as Sheyenne River Bridge, was built by the Works Project Administration in 1936.  It was listed on the National Register of Historic Places in 1997.

References

Road bridges on the National Register of Historic Places in North Dakota
Bridges completed in 1936
National Register of Historic Places in Ransom County, North Dakota
Steel bridges in the United States
Cantilever bridges in the United States
Works Progress Administration in North Dakota
Transportation in Ransom County, North Dakota
Lisbon, North Dakota
1936 establishments in North Dakota